Roads in the City of Westminster, London, England include:

 Aldwych
 Baker Street
 Bayswater Road
 Belgrave Road
 Birdcage Walk
 Bond Street
 Brook Street
 Buckingham Palace Road
 Charing Cross Road
 Constitution Hill
 Coventry Street
 Downing Street
 Drury Lane
 Grosvenor Square
 Harley Street
 Haymarket
 Horse Guards Road
 Jermyn Street
 Leicester Square
 Long Acre
 The Mall
 Marylebone Road
 Millbank
 Northumberland Avenue
 Oxford Street
 Pall Mall
 Park Lane
 Piccadilly
 Piccadilly Circus
 Portland Place
 Prince Consort Road
 Regent Street
 Shaftesbury Avenue
 Smith Square
 Strand
 Trafalgar Square
 Victoria Embankment
 Victoria Street
 Whitehall

Roads